Barbara Julie Dunkelman (born July 2, 1989) is a Canadian actress and internet personality. She is known for her work with the production company Rooster Teeth, where she serves as a Creative Director and was formerly the Director of Social and Community Marketing and a Program Director for RTX. She also provides the voice of Yang Xiao Long in the web series RWBY, and is a partial owner of the FCF Wild Aces Indoor Football Team.

Early life 
Dunkelman was born in Montreal, Quebec, to a Jewish family, and was raised alongside two brothers. She and her family moved to Ottawa, Ontario, when she was 8 years old. She graduated from Concordia University with a degree in Marketing in June 2011. Dunkelman is a permanent resident of the United States, residing in Austin, Texas.

Career 

Dunkelman signed up on Rooster Teeth's website in October 2004. In 2005 she attended and assisted at the premiere Toronto Red vs. Blue fan event, RvBTO. Starting in 2008, she helped organize it as co-host and Rooster Teeth liaison. She was a hostess for WatchMojo.com for several months in 2010. 

In September 2011, she co-founded the triple award-winning Internet Box podcast hosted by herself, Michael Jones, Ray Narvaez, Jr., Andrew Blanchard, Mike Kroon, and Dylan "Dylon" Saramago, with Lindsay Jones and Kerry Shawcross being added to the cast later on. In December 2011, she was hired by Rooster Teeth as their first Community Manager, in charge of developing community features and the company's social media. At the time of her hiring she was the most-followed member on the Rooster Teeth community site. Since February 2012, she appears regularly on the award-winning Rooster Teeth Podcast. 

In May 2013, alongside fellow employee Jack Pattillo, she was interviewed as part of Microsoft's 2013 E3 Xbox One reveal. Despite her numerous appearances on the podcast and at events, she estimates that "only 25 percent" of her job, which entails marketing and management functions within the company, takes place in the public eye. Also in 2013, she began voicing the character of Yang Xiao Long in the Streamy Award-winning series RWBY, which is her most recognizable acting role. She has also lent her voice to Cosmos in Fairy Tail and ORF in X-Ray and Vav. 

Beginning in September 2016, Dunkelman began hosting Always Open, a lifestyle and sexual health podcast within Rooster Teeth. The podcast went on indefinite hiatus in June 2020. Also in September 2016, Dunkelman launched an eponymous clothing line at Rooster Teeth. In September 2019, Dunkelman became a Creative Director at Rooster Teeth. 

Dunkelman has amassed a number of live-action acting credits, which include roles in Rooster Teeth Shorts, Immersion, Day 5, and Ten Little Roosters, as well as the horror comedy Blood Fest. She is also one of five partial owners of the FCF Wild Aces Indoor Football Team.

Personal life
Dunkelman has been in a relationship with producer Trevor Collins since 2018. In 2021, she revealed in a video on her YouTube channel that she has a severe case of hyperhidrosis, and that she would be seeking surgery to curtail the effects of her condition.

Filmography

References

External links 

 Barbara Dunkelman's profile on Rooster Teeth
 
 

1989 births
Living people
Actresses from Montreal
Anglophone Quebec people
Canadian emigrants to the United States
Canadian feminists
Canadian video game actresses
Canadian voice actresses
Canadian web series actresses
Concordia University alumni
Jewish Canadian actresses
Rooster Teeth people
21st-century Canadian actresses
21st-century Canadian screenwriters